The protected areas of Chile are areas that have natural beauty or significant historical value  protected by the government of Chile. The National System of Protected Wild Areas (SNASPE by its Spanish acronym) is regulated by law #18,362 passed in 1984, and administered by the National Forest Corporation (CONAF).

There are three types of territories: 
 National Parks
 National Reserves
 Natural Monuments

Protected areas by type

National parks

National reserves

Natural monuments

Protected areas by region

Arica and Parinacota Region
Las Vicuñas National Reserve
Lauca National Park
Salar de Surire Natural Monument

Tarapacá Region
Pampa del Tamarugal National Reserve
Volcán Isluga National Park

Antofagasta Region
Alto Loa National Reserve
La Chimba National Reserve
La Portada Natural Monument
Llullaillaco National Park
Los Flamencos National Reserve
North Paposo National Monument

Atacama Region
Llanos de Challe National Park
Nevado Tres Cruces National Park
Pan de Azúcar National Park
Pingüino de Humboldt National Reserve

Coquimbo Region
Bosque de Fray Jorge National Park
Las Chinchillas National Reserve
Pichasca Natural Monument

Valparaíso Region
Archipiélago de Juan Fernández National Park
El Yali National Reserve
Isla Cachagua Natural Monument 
La Campana National Park
Lago Peñuelas National Reserve
Rapa Nui National Park
Río Blanco National Reserve

Santiago Metropolitan Region
El Morado Natural Monument
Río Clarillo National Reserve
Roblería del Cobre de Loncha National Reserve
Yerba Loca Nature Sanctuary

O'Higgins Region
Las Palmas de Cocalán National Park
Río de los Cipreses National Reserve

Maule Region
Altos de Lircay National Reserve
Federico Albert National Reserve
Laguna Torca National Reserve
Los Bellotos del Melado National Reserve
Los Queules National Reserve
Los Ruiles National Reserve
Radal Siete Tazas National Reserve

Bío-Bío Region
Isla Mocha National Reserve
Laguna del Laja National Park
Los Huemules de Niblinto National Reserve
Ñuble National Reserve
Ralco National Reserve

Araucanía Region
Alto Biobío National Reserve
Cerro Ñielol Natural Monument
China Muerta National Reserve
Conguillío National Park
Contulmo Natural Monument 
Huerquehue National Park
Malalcahuello National Reserve
Malleco National Reserve
Nahuelbuta National Park
Nalcas National Reserve
Tolhuaca National Park
Villarrica National Park
Villarrica National Reserve

Los Ríos Region
Alerce Costero National Park
Área Costera Protegida Punta Curiñanco
Carlos Anwandter Nature Sanctuary
Huilo-Huilo Biological Reserve
Mocho-Choshuenco National Reserve
Oncol Park
Puyehue National Park
Valdivia National Reserve
Valdivian Coastal Reserve
Villarrica National Park

Los Lagos Region
Alerce Andino National Park
Chiloé National Park
Corcovado National Park
Futaleufú National Reserve
Hornopirén National Park
Islotes de Puñihuil Natural Monument
Lago Palena National Reserve
Lahuen Ñadi Natural Monument
Llanquihue National Reserve
Los Vertientes Private Nature Reserve
Pumalín Park
Puyehue National Park
Tantauco Park
Vicente Pérez Rosales National Park

Aisén Region
Bernardo O'Higgins National Park
Cerro Castillo National Reserve
Cinco Hermanas Natural Monument 
Coihaique National Reserve
Dos Lagunas Natural Monument
Isla Guamblin National Park
Isla Magdalena National Park
Katalalixar National Reserve
Lago Carlota National Reserve
Lago Cochrane National Reserve
Lago Jeinimeni National Reserve
Lago Las Torres National Reserve
Lago Rosselot National Reserve
Laguna de San Rafael National Park
Las Guaitecas National Reserve
Patagonia National Park
Queulat National Park
Río Simpson National Reserve
Trapananda National Reserve

Magallanes and Antartica Chilena Region
Alberto de Agostini National Park
Bernardo O'Higgins National Park
Cabo de Hornos National Park
Cueva del Milodón Natural Monument
Francisco Coloane Coastal and Marine Protected Area
Kawésqar National Park
Laguna de los Cisnes Natural Monument 
Laguna Parrillar National Reserve
Los Pingüinos Natural Monument
Magallanes National Reserve
Omora Ethnobotanical Park
Pali-Aike National Park
Torres del Paine National Park
Yendegaia National Park

See also
 National Monuments of Chile

External links
 Official website of CONAF, (Chilean National Forest Corporation), a government agency that is part of the Agriculture Ministry

 

qu:Chilipi amachasqa sallqa suyukuna
ru:Национальные заповедники Чили